KCA President's Cup T20 is  an Indian Twenty20 cricket league organized by Kerala Cricket Association in the state of Kerala. The league is designed on the lines of successful Indian Premier League.

Organisation

Tournament format and squad composition
KCA President's Cup T20 features six teams namely KCA Lions, KCA Tigers, KCA Royals, KCA Panthers, KCA Eagles, and KCA Tuskers. Domestic players in Kerala participates in the league. Each team consist of 14 players and 2 support staffs. There are also 4 players for each team, if replacements are required. The tournament have a round-robin format with each team playing against each other twice followed by playoffs - semi finals and final. All of these are day-games with white ball and coloured clothing as per BCCI playing conditions. Two matches were played in a day. There was be a total of 33 matches in the first season.

Sponsorship and broadcasting

The promoters of the KCA President's Cup T20 is Dream 11. Twenty First Century Media pvt lmt. are the official  branding partners, marketers and broadcasting partners of the league for three years. There are no franchises or owners. TCM Sports Management Pvt Ltd, a sports marketing company, associated with KCA as a commercial partner. The matches were streamed live exclusively in India on FanCode app.

Venue
The venue for the first season of KCA President's Cup T20 was Sanatana Dharma College Ground, Alappuzha. Audience are not allowed in the stadiums due to strict restrictions because of the COVID-19 pandemic in Kerala.

Teams

Season 1 (2020-21)

2020–21 KCA President's Cup T20 will be the first edition of KCA President's Cup T20. It was planned to be held from 17 December 2020 to 3 January. But the tournament got postponed as the Kerala Cricket Association didn't get a clearance from the Kerala state government to organize the tournament due to the Covid-19 pandemic. The tournament finally started from 6 March. The Kerala senior team players who were in Delhi for the 2020-21 Vijay Hazare Trophy knockout matches joined their respective squads later after undergoing RT-PCR tests on return. KCA Royals won the title.

See also

Indian Premier League
Karnataka Premier League
Tamil Nadu Premier League
Celebrity Cricket League
List of regional T20 cricket leagues in India
List of cricket competitions

References

External links

Official website

Twenty20 cricket leagues
Sport in Kerala
Cricket leagues in India
Professional sports leagues in India
Sport in India